Bronant is a hamlet in the county of Ceredigion, mid Wales. It lies on the A485 road which runs north from Tregaron to Llanilar and falls within the community of Lledrod. The Cors Caron national nature reserve lies three miles to the southeast. Also of note is the Roman road of Sarn Helen which passes to the east of the hamlet. It is known to geologists as it gives its name to the Bronnant Fault.

Notable People
David Owen Morgan FRSE (1893-1959) parasitologist and cell biologist born and raised here.

References 

Hamlets in Wales